Canarian Assembly (AC) was a left-wing nationalist political party operating in the Canary Islands. The party aims were self-determination for the islands, workers' self-management and socialism.

History
AC was born 1982, from the Federación Autogestionaria de Asociaciones de Vecinos de Gran Canaria (Self-managed Federation of Neighborhood Associations of Gran Canaria). AC was a Canarian nationalist and self-management socialist force. In the general elections of 1982 AC joined a coalition with the Communist Party of the Canaries (PCC-PCE). The coalition was known as Canarian Assembly-Canarian Coordination, gaining only the 2.87% of the vote in the Islands.

In the local elections of 1983 AC gained 30 town councillors and the mayorships of Telde and Santa Lucía de Tirajana, gaining the 3.32% of the vote. The same year the first ever Canarian elections were held. AC made a coalition with the Canarian People's Union for this elections, gaining the 8.42% of the vote and seats in the Canarian Parliament.

In 1986 AC made a new coalition with the Canarian Nationalist Left (INC). In the 1987 Canarian elections the coalition got 46,229 votes (6.96%) and 2 seats. After the elections INC and AC merged, forming the Canarian Nationalist Assembly.

See also
 Canarian nationalism

References

Political parties in the Canary Islands
Defunct socialist parties in Spain
Political parties established in 1982
Defunct nationalist parties in Spain
1982 establishments in Spain
Canarian nationalist parties
Left-wing nationalist parties